Zubovskaya Bay is a body of water (bay) on the northern coast of the Rybachy Peninsula, itself on the northeastern coast of the Kola Peninsula, Murmansk Oblast, Russia. It opens into the Barents Sea, and shares its name with the abandoned village of Zubovka.

References

Bays of the Barents Sea
Bays of Murmansk Oblast